Sydney City or Sydney city may refer to:
Sydney, the largest city in Australia
Sydney central business district, the central city area in Sydney, Australia
City of Sydney, the municipal council responsible for central Sydney, Australia
Hakoah Sydney City East FC, a soccer club formerly competing in the Australian National Soccer League
Sydney, Nova Scotia, a community in Canada formerly a city (1904–1995)